The Reign of Ren and Xuan was the Hongxi Emperor and the Xuande Emperor adopted the policy of the cabinet scholars Yang Shiqi (楊士奇), Yang Pu (楊溥), Yang Yong (楊榮) (Three Yangs, 三楊), Xia Yuanji, and Jian Yi (蹇義) of loosely governing the country and resting troops to support the people, making the eleven-year period of their reign (1424 to 1435) an era of clarity of officials, economic development, and social stability in the history of the Ming dynasty.

External links
  Reign of Ren and Xuan

Ming dynasty politics
Reigns